Filip Brattbakk (born 24 April 2000) is a Norwegian footballer who plays as a winger for Raufoss. Born in Denmark, he has played for the Norway U17 national team internationally.

Career
Filip Brattbakk joined Rosenborg ahead of 2015 from local club Trond. After spending several years in the academy, ahead of the 2020 season he was promoted to the senior squad and signed a new contract with the club. His debut came later in the year against Vålerenga on 1 July coming on as a substitute in the 89th minute.

Personal life
He is the son of former Rosenborg, FC København and Celtic player Harald Martin Brattbakk. Due to his father's stint at FC København, Filip was born in Copenhagen.

Career statistics

Club

Honours
Rosenborg
Norwegian U-19 Championship: 2019
Norwegian U-16 Championship: 2016

References

External links
 Profile at RBK.no

2000 births
Living people
Norwegian footballers
Footballers from Trondheim
Association football midfielders
Norway youth international footballers
Eliteserien players
Norwegian First Division players
Rosenborg BK players
Ranheim Fotball players
Raufoss IL players